Irena Olevsky (born 22 March 1974) is a former Australian synchronized swimmer who competed in the 2000 Summer Olympics.

Personal life
Olevsky was born on 22 March 1974 in Moscow, Russia.

Synchronised swimming
Olevsky and Naomi Young competed at the 1998 Commonwealth Games, and received a silver medal in the duet event. Olevsky also competed at the 2000 Summer Olympics, placing 8th in the team event and 16th in the duet event with Young.

Olevsky competed at the 2006 Commonwealth Games, receiving a silver medal in the Free Routine Duet with Dannielle Liesch, as well as a bronze medal in the Free Routine Solo event. Olevsky retired shortly after the Commonwealth Games, after 27 years of competition in the sport.

External links
Irena Olevsky (Australia) melbourne2006.com.au

References

1974 births
Living people
Australian synchronised swimmers
Olympic synchronised swimmers of Australia
Synchronized swimmers at the 2000 Summer Olympics
Commonwealth Games silver medallists for Australia
Commonwealth Games bronze medallists for Australia
Synchronised swimmers at the 1998 Commonwealth Games
Synchronised swimmers at the 2006 Commonwealth Games
Commonwealth Games medallists in synchronised swimming
Medallists at the 1998 Commonwealth Games
Medallists at the 2006 Commonwealth Games